The 1976 U.S. Open was the 76th U.S. Open, held June 17–20 at the Highlands Course of the Atlanta Athletic Club in Duluth, Georgia, a suburb northeast of Atlanta. Tour rookie Jerry Pate won his only major championship, two strokes ahead of runners-up Al Geiberger and Tom Weiskopf.

John Mahaffey, who lost the U.S. Open in a playoff the year before, took the lead with a 68 in the second round. He followed that up with a 69 in the third round on Saturday for a two-stroke lead over Jerry Pate after 54 holes, with Geiberger three back and Weiskopf four back. The gap was still two strokes after fourteen holes, but Pate hit a one-iron close and birdied the par-3 15th; and  when Mahaffey bogeyed 16, the two were tied. Mahaffey three-putted for bogey on 17 and Pate took a one-stroke lead as Mahaffey fell into a tie for second with Geiberger and Weiskopf, both in the clubhouse with 279.

Both Mahaffey and Pate found the rough off the 18th tee. Mahaffey, behind by a shot and trying for birdie, hit his approach shot into the water fronting the green and made bogey, and fell into a tie for fourth. Having a better lie in the rough, Pate gambled that he could clear the water and then hit one of the most memorable shots in U.S. Open history. His 5-iron approach from  flew directly on to the green and stopped  from the hole, and he made the birdie putt for a two-stroke victory.

The U.S. Amateur champion two years earlier in 1974, Pate was only 22 in 1976 and appeared to have a bright future ahead of him, but shoulder injuries significantly shortened his career. He won seven more PGA Tour tournaments, the last in 1982, and finished runner-up in two additional majors in the late 1970s.

Future champion Fuzzy Zoeller made his major championship debut at this U.S. Open and finished in 38th place. Mike Reid, a 21-year-old amateur, led by three shots after the first round, but a second-round 81 dashed any hope of an amateur champion. He shared low-amateur honors with John Fought at 300 (+20).

Jack Nicklaus finished tied for eleventh and saw his streak of 13 consecutive top-10s in majors come to an end. He began a new streak and finished in the top-10 in the next nine majors. Only Harry Vardon made more consecutive major top-10s when he made sixteen in a row – fifteen Open Championships (1894–1908) and the U.S. Open in 1900.

This was the first of four majors held at the Highlands Course; it hosted the PGA Championship in 1981, 2001, and 2011.

This was the first year that players were allowed to have their own caddies at the U.S. Open. The other majors and some PGA Tour events had traditionally disallowed players from using their own caddies. The Masters required club caddies from Augusta National through 1982.

Course layout
Atlanta Athletic Club, Highlands Course

Source:

Past champions in the field

Made the cut

Missed the cut

Source:

Round summaries

First round
Thursday, June 17, 1976

Amateur Mike Reid, age 21, grabbed the first round lead with a three-under 67, while the rest of the field posted no better than par. Several professionals voiced their concerns over the  playing conditions of the course.

Source:

Second round
Friday, June 18, 1976

John Mahaffey shot a 68 and grabbed the lead, while amateur Reid fell into a tie for 32nd place with an 81.

Source:

Third round
Saturday, June 19, 1976

Mahaffey kept the lead with a 69, two strokes ahead of Pate, with Al Geiberger and Tom Weiskopf in third and fourth place. After nine holes, Mahaffey opened up a six-stroke lead but struggled on the back nine and, with Pate making a remarkable eagle on 12, the lead was cut to two when the day ended.

Source:

Final round
Sunday, June 20, 1976

Source:

Scorecard

Cumulative tournament scores, relative to par

Source:

References

External links
GolfCompendium.com:1976 U.S. Open
USGA Championship Database
USOpen.com - 1976

U.S. Open (golf)
Golf in Georgia (U.S. state)
Sports in Duluth, Georgia
U.S. Open
U.S. Open (golf)
U.S. Open (golf)